Menlo Park may refer to:

Places
Menlo Park, California, a city in San Mateo County, U.S.
Menlo Park, New Jersey, an unincorporated community in Middlesex County, New Jersey, U.S.
Menlo Park, Pretoria, a suburb in South Africa
Menlo Park Mall, a shopping mall in Edison, New Jersey, U.S.
Menlo Park station, a station on the Caltrain line in Menlo Park, California, U.S.
Menlo Park Terrace, an unincorporated community in New Jersey, U.S.
Menlo Park, a historical neighborhood of Tucson, Arizona

Other
Menlo Park (band), an alternative-rock band

See also
Menlo (disambiguation)
West Menlo Park, California, an unincorporated community in San Mateo County, California, U.S.